John Kleckner (born 1978 in United States) is an American painter, based in Berlin, Germany.

Life 
Kleckner's artwork has been shown internationally at galleries and museums such as Galerie Judin in Berlin, the Deste Foundation in Athens, the Yerba Buena Center for the Arts in San Francisco, Centre d'Arts Plastiques Contemporains (CAPC) in Bordeaux, and the Royal Academy in London. His work is featured in several collections including the Saatchi Gallery and The Judith Rothschild Foundation Drawings Collection at The Museum of Modern Art in New York City. Kleckner is currently an instructor of painting and drawing at Bard College Berlin.

External links
John Kleckner - Saatchi Gallery
 MoMA
 Magasin 3
 Bard College Berlin

1978 births
Living people
20th-century American painters
American male painters
21st-century American painters
21st-century American male artists
Artists from Iowa
20th-century American male artists